}}

The United States national under-18 baseball team is the national under-18 baseball team of United States in international-level baseball competitions. The organization  is currently ranked 2nd in the world by the International Baseball Federation. They have won the U-18 Baseball World Cup 8 times.

The U.S. national 18U team debuted their international team in the Friendship Series, in 1983.

Current roster

Primary National Team Tournament Records

Record by team

See also

 United States national baseball team
 United States women's national baseball team
 USA Baseball
 USA Baseball National Training Complex

References

External links

National under-18
National under-18 baseball teams
Baseball
National under-18